BBC Dorset FM was a BBC Local Radio station based in Dorchester, covering the county of Dorset in England which broadcast from 1993 to 1996.  It was the last BBC Local Radio station to launch which covered a previously unserved area.  It operated as an opt-out station from BBC Radio Devon for around 23 hours a week.

History

BBC Dorset FM emerged after plans for a full-time station for Dorset were cancelled in 1990, as part of a series of measures designed to save £3 million. Dorset FM opened on 26 April 1993, broadcasting to west and central Dorset on 103.8 FM from its transmitter on Bincombe Hill.

The station produced three-and-a-half hours of its own programming each weekday - Good Morning Dorset from 0630-0900, and Dorset Newshour from 1200-1300.  In addition there were three hours of programmes on Saturday and two hours on Sunday.  The remainder of the station's output was relayed from BBC Radio Devon.

In early 1996 BBC Dorset FM closed, and was replaced on 103.8 FM by a relay of BBC Radio Solent, albeit with a news and information service tailored to rural Dorset.  The Dorchester studio became a district office of Radio Solent.

Planned relaunch

By 2004 the BBC were proposing a series of new BBC local radio stations, including one for Dorset. However, as a part of a series of cutbacks announced in October 2007, plans for the station were abandoned. The Dorset Broadcasting Action Group continues to campaign for the introduction of a separate station for Dorset.

Thanks to continued pressure on the BBC by the Dorset Broadcasting Action Group (DorBAG), the BBC finally launched a new dedicated Dorset Breakfast programme on 8 July 2013. This is now an opt-out from BBC Radio Solent on 103.8FM using the transmitter at Bincombe Hill and, more recently on several DAB transmitters but neither FM nor DAB reach most of West Dorset due to coverage of the Bincombe Hill/DAB transmitters which effectively only reach mid/south Dorset, leaving much of the county still uncovered. The BBC has agreed with DorBAG that the ultimate aim is to extend the programme to cover the whole county. This may require additional transmitters which is under discussion between the BBC and DorBAG.

It transmits from 0630 to 0900 weekdays. However, it is also available online and on Freeview channel 734. The reporting/editorial team based in the Dorchester studio create and run the programme. The remainder of the broadcasts each day are Radio Solent material that covers the whole BBC Radio Solent region.

References

External links 
BBC Dorset website
Dorset Broadcasting Action Group
Bincombe Hill transmitter

Defunct BBC Local Radio stations
Radio stations established in 1993
Radio stations in Dorset
1993 establishments in England